Dark Shadows is an American gothic soap opera that originally aired weekdays on the ABC television network, from June 27, 1966, to April 2, 1971. A total of 1,225 episodes were produced, but during the course of its run, the show was pre-empted 20 times. ABC would compensate for this by occasionally skipping, double numbering and, in one case, triple numbering episodes in order to keep a show ending in a 5 or 0 airing on Fridays. This is why the last episode produced has #1245 when in actuality it was only the 1,225th episode produced. The following is a complete list of all episodes. Along with production information, it also includes a list of the DVD releases in volume format.

1966

1967

1968

1969

1970

1971

See also
 Dark Shadows (televised storylines)
 Dark Shadows (audio drama)

External links
 Dark Shadows episode guide

Dark Shadows
Dark Shadows
Dark Shadows